The Connection may refer to:

The Connection (band), a rock n roll band from Portsmouth, New Hampshire
The Connection (play), a stage play by Jack Gelber, performed by the Living Theater
The Music From The Connection (Freddie Redd Quartet), a jazz album of music for Jack Gelber's 1959 play composed by Freddie Redd and released by Blue Note Records
Music from the Connection, a jazz album by Howard McGhee, also featuring Redd's music, released by Felsted Records
The Connection (1961 film), a Shirley Clarke film adapted from the 1959 play by Jack Gelber
The Connection (DeLon album), 2005
The Connection (Papa Roach album), 2012
The Connection (radio program), a National Public Radio program broadcast in the United States from 1994 to 2005
"The Connection", the third song from Phish's 2004 album Undermind
The Connection (1973 film), a 1973 film by Tom Gries
The Connection (2014 action film), a 2014 French-Belgian film by Cédric Jimenez

See also
Connection (disambiguation)